The People of the State of California v. Robert Page Anderson, 493 P.2d 880, 6 Cal. 3d 628 (Cal. 1972), was a landmark case in the state of California that outlawed capital punishment for nine months until the enactment of a constitutional amendment reinstating it, Proposition 17.

Background 

The case was an automatic appeal to the court under section 1239b of the California Penal Code, which provides that, following a death sentence, the case is automatically appealed to the State Supreme Court.

Robert Page Anderson was convicted of first-degree murder, attempted murder of three men, and first-degree robbery. The Supreme Court affirmed the judgment of the lower court in People v. Anderson 64 Cal.2d 633 [51 Cal.Rptr. 238, 414 P.2d 366] (1966), but it reversed its decision with respect to the sentence of the death penalty In re Anderson, 69 Cal.2d 613 (1968) following the landmark case Witherspoon v. Illinois (1968), which decided that it was illegal to remove a juror who simply disagreed with the death penalty unless the juror adamantly refused to follow the law under any circumstances.

The case was retried on the issue of the defendant's penalty, and the jury again returned a verdict of death.

Decision 

In the original case (1966), the court did not raise the issue as to whether the death penalty was unconstitutional. In the second hearing, which also took place in 1968, the court did raise the issue but decided that the death penalty was neither cruel nor unusual. However, in view of Witherspoon, the court found that the defendant's death sentence was unconstitutionally decided.  In this third hearing, the court changed its mind and decided the death penalty was cruel or unusual.

The court ruled that the use of capital punishment was considered impermissibly cruel or unusual as it degraded and dehumanized the parties involved. It held that the penalty is "unnecessary to any legitimate goal of the state and [is] incompatible with the dignity of man and the judicial process".

Furthermore, the court also cited the view of capital punishment in American society as one of the most important reasons for its acceptability, contending that a growing population and a decreasing number of executions was persuasive evidence that such a punishment was no longer condoned by the general public.

The case also turned on a difference in wording between the U.S. Constitution's 8th Amendment argument against cruel and unusual punishment and Article 1, Section 6 of the California Constitution (the provision has since moved to Article 1, Section 17), which read (emphasis added):

Since the State Constitution prohibits a punishment which is either of the two conditions (as opposed to prohibiting ones that violate both conditions), the court found the penalty unconstitutional on state constitutional grounds since if it violated either provision it was unconstitutional at the state level. The court even went so far as to decline to even consider if the death penalty violates the Eighth Amendment to the United States Constitution since it had already found it to be in violation of the state constitution. The court decided it on  April 24, 1972.

The state contended that while the use of capital punishment served no rehabilitating purposes, it was a legitimate punishment for retribution in serious offenses, in that it served to isolate the offender, and was a useful deterrent to crime. The court rejected the state's defense citing that there were far less onerous means of isolating the offender, and the lack of proof that capital punishment is an effective deterrent.

Dissent 

Justice Marshall F. McComb wrote a brief dissent on the basis that the landmark case, Furman v. Georgia  was currently on the docket of the Supreme Court of the United States and that the court should await its decision before ruling. (The U.S. Supreme Court later ruled in Furman that the death penalty—as then practiced in almost all of the states that used it—was unconstitutional.)  As it turned out, the U.S. Supreme Court would set aside the question whether the death penalty was per se unconstitutional (later in Gregg v. Georgia it ruled that the death penalty was constitutional).

McComb also argued that the death penalty deterred crime, noting numerous Supreme Court precedents upholding the death penalty's constitutionality, and stating that the legislative and initiative processes were the only appropriate avenues to determine whether the death penalty should be allowed. McComb was so upset about the Anderson decision that he walked out of the courtroom.

Aftermath 

The Anderson decision caused all capital sentences in the state of California to be commuted to life in prison.  Notably, it is because of this decision that Charles Manson avoided execution following his conviction and resulting death sentence for the "Tate-LaBianca" murders in 1969.  Sirhan Sirhan also had his death sentence for the assassination of Robert Kennedy commuted to life in prison.  It would also mean that if any person was ever charged with a murder committed in California before 1972, the death penalty could not be imposed.  The United States Supreme Court in Aikens v. California, 406 U.S. 813 (1972) denied an appeal of a death sentence because:

Later in 1972, the people of California amended the state constitution by initiative process, superseding the court ruling and reinstating the death penalty.  Rather than simply switch to the federal "cruel and unusual" standard, the amendment, called Proposition 17, kept the "cruel or unusual" standard, but followed it with a clause expressly declaring the death penalty to be neither cruel nor unusual.

Due to the U.S. Supreme Court decision in Furman later the same year declaring most capital statutes (including the one in California, but excluding others like the one in Rhode Island) in the U.S. to be unconstitutional, plus extensive appellate and habeas corpus litigation in capital cases, no death sentences were carried out in the state until 1992.  That year, Robert Alton Harris was executed in the gas chamber.

In a 1978 concurring opinion, Justice Mosk expressed his dismay at the response of the California electorate to Anderson:

Anderson's sentence was later commuted, and, in 1976, he was paroled and moved to Seattle.  He died there in 1999 at the age of 62.

Documentation
The incident was documented in The Hub Shootout: San Diego's Unbelievable Four-hour Firefight, which revisits the events and sequelae of San Diego's longest (at the time, four hours) armed siege/shootout at the Hub Loans & Jewelry Company.  A newspaper editor died of a heart attack.  Over a thousand rounds were exchanged betweend the shooter and a SWAT team.  The "murder case would eventually make California judicial history and keep Charles Manson and Sirhan Sirhan from the gas chamber."

See also 

 Capital punishment in California

References

Citations

Bibliography

External links 

 Opinion of the Court Retrieved April 7, 2008.
 Opinion of the Court (Registration Required)
 Ninth Circuit Capital Punishment Handbook

California state case law
Cruel and Unusual Punishment Clause and death penalty case law
Capital punishment in California
1972 in United States case law
1972 in California